Jacques Bermon Webster II (born April 30, 1991), better known by his stage name Travis Scott (formerly stylized as Travi$ Scott), is an American rapper, singer, songwriter, and record producer. His stage name is the namesake of a favorite uncle combined with the first name of one of his inspirations, Kid Cudi (whose real name is Scott Mescudi).

In 2012, Scott signed his first major-label contract with Epic Records and a publishing deal with Kanye West's GOOD Music. In April 2013, he signed a joint-recording contract with Epic and T.I.'s Grand Hustle imprint. Scott's first full-length project, the mixtape Owl Pharaoh, was self-released in 2013. It was followed with a second mixtape, Days Before Rodeo, in 2014. His debut studio album, Rodeo (2015), was led by the hit single "Antidote". His second album, Birds in the Trap Sing McKnight (2016), became his first number one album on the Billboard 200. The following year, Scott released a collaborative album with Quavo titled Huncho Jack, Jack Huncho under the group name Huncho Jack.

In 2018, his third studio album, Astroworld, was released to critical acclaim and produced his first Billboard Hot 100 number one single, "Sicko Mode" (featuring Drake). In late 2019, Scott's record label Cactus Jack Records released the compilation album JackBoys, which topped the Billboard 200. After the release of his single "Franchise" (featuring Young Thug and M.I.A.) in 2020, Scott became the first artist on the Hot 100 to have three songs debut at number one in less than a year.

Over the course of his career, Scott has become a globally recognized artist and pop culture figure. Along with his highly publicized relationship with American media personality Kylie Jenner, Scott has collaborated with organizations including Nike, Dior, and McDonald's. In 2017, he founded the record label Cactus Jack Records. Throughout his career, Scott has achieved four number-one hits on the Billboard Hot 100, along with 80 total charted songs. Additionally, he has been nominated for eight Grammy Awards and won a Billboard Music Award, Latin Grammy Award, MTV Video Music Award, and multiple BET Hip Hop Awards.

Scott has also gained notoriety for controversies and legal issues regarding safety at his concerts. In November 2021, a mass-casualty crowd crush occurred during Scott's performance at the Astroworld Festival in his hometown of Houston, Texas, resulting in widespread condemnation of the artist.

Early life
Jacques Bermon Webster II was born on April 30, 1991, in Houston, Texas. From ages one through six, Webster lived with his grandmother in South Park, Houston. Located in south-central Houston, the neighborhood was notorious for crime and had an impact on a young Webster, "Growing up, my grandmother stayed in the 'hood so I seen random crazy shit. [I saw] mad bums and crazy spazzed out motherfuckers, I saw people looking weird, hungry, and grimey. I was always like, 'I gotta get the fuck out this shit.' It gave me my edge—[it made me] who I am right now." Webster moved to Missouri City, a middle-class suburban area bordering southwest Houston, to live with his parents. His mother worked for Apple and his father ran his own business. Webster's father is also a soul musician and his grandfather was a jazz composer. Webster attended Elkins High School and graduated at seventeen. During high school, he participated in musical theater. Webster then attended the University of Texas at San Antonio, before dropping out his second year to fully pursue his music career.

Career

2008–2012: Career beginnings and record deals
Webster formed a duo with his longtime friend Chris Holloway known as The Graduates. In 2008, the duo released their untitled first EP on social networking website Myspace.

The following year, Scott and OG Chess, one of Scott's schoolmates, formed the group The Classmates. The Classmates released two projects, with Buddy Rich in 2009 and Cruis'n USA in 2010. Scott mainly handled production work on both projects. The duo remained together until late 2012, when personal conflicts and financial disputes led to the disbandment of the group.

After leaving college, Scott moved from Houston to Washington Heights in New York City where Scott began working with friend Mike Waxx, who owned the music website Illroots. After moving to New York, Scott slept on the floor at his friend's house and spent most of his time at Just Blaze's studio. Eventually frustrated in New York and the lack of progression, Scott moved to Los Angeles, California, after only four months in the state.

In Los Angeles, Webster was abandoned by his friend who had promised to help him by providing housing. His parents cut him off financially and he eventually was forced to relocate back to Houston, where his parents kicked him out of their home. Webster moved back to Los Angeles once again and began to sleep on the couch of a friend who studied at University of Southern California. Atlanta-based rapper and owner of Grand Hustle Records, T.I. would later hear one of Webster's productions, titled "Lights (Love Sick)". While in Los Angeles, T.I.'s representative contacted Webster, asking him to attend a studio for a meeting. During the meeting, T.I. freestyled over "Animal", one of Webster's productions.

2012–2014: Owl Pharaoh and Days Before Rodeo

Scott's First solo full-length project is a mixtape Titled Owl Pharaoh, which was set to be released as a free download in 2012. However, the project was delayed, and was announced to be slated for a later release. The project was later re-created by Kanye West and Mike Dean, and was then again delayed for sample clearance issues. In promotion Scott would release the track, "Blocka La Flame", a remix of fellow GOOD Music label-mate Pusha T's single "Blocka" (which features production and vocals from Scott). The song was produced by Young Chop, with additional production by Scott himself, alongside Mike Dean. On March 22, 2013, Scott released the music video for a song titled "Quintana", set to appear on Owl Pharaoh. The mixtape's version of the song features guest vocals from fellow American rapper Wale, while the production was handled by Scott himself, alongside Sak Pase and Mike Dean. On March 27, XXL revealed that Scott was a member of their Freshman Class of 2013. On March 29, 2013, following his interview with British disc jockey, DJ Semtex, Scott premiered a snippet of his commercial debut single, titled "Upper Echelon", featuring 2 Chainz and T.I. On April 2, 2013, Scott stated Owl Pharaoh was his official debut mixtape and would be released on the iTunes Store on May 21, 2013. On April 23, 2013, "Upper Echelon" was sent to urban contemporary radio. The EP was released for free download.

On March 13, 2014, Scott performed a new song, tentatively titled "1975" featuring Big Sean, from his upcoming project at the time, at the Texan music festival South by Southwest (SXSW). Scott later confirmed via his Twitter account that the song is not called "1975", and would be included on his second mixtape, titled Days Before Rodeo. He would later take to his Twitter account to announce Rodeo, as the official title for his major-label debut studio album. On May 5, 2014, Scott released the full version of the song, with its new title "Don't Play", featuring a sample of the song "M.O.N.E.Y" by the English rock band the 1975. On July 11, 2014, "Don't Play" was officially released as the lead single from Days Before Rodeo, via digital distribution.

Following the success of Days Before Rodeo, Scott announced that he would headline a concert tour, called The Rodeo Tour, with rapper Young Thug and producer Metro Boomin. The tour started on March 1, 2015, in Santa Ana, California, and ended on April 1, 2015, in Portland, Oregon. The tour ran through major cities such as Denver, Colorado, Houston, Texas, Chicago, Illinois, Detroit, Michigan, New York City, Atlanta, Georgia, Philadelphia, San Diego, Los Angeles, San Francisco, California and Seattle, Washington. Second shows were added to some cities such as Los Angeles and New York City, after his first shows sold out. Artists such as Kanye West, Chris Brown, Wale and Birdman made special guest appearances in certain cities.

2015–2016: Rodeo and Birds in the Trap Sing McKnight

Rodeo was released on September 4, 2015, by Grand Hustle and Epic Records. The album features guest appearances from Quavo, Juicy J, Kanye West, The Weeknd, Swae Lee, Chief Keef, Justin Bieber, Young Thug and Toro y Moi, and includes production from Mike Dean, Kanye West, WondaGurl, Suber, DJ Dahi, Metro Boomin, 1500 or Nothin', Sonny Digital, Southside, Terrace Martin, Zaytoven, Pharrell Williams and Scott himself, among others. The album was supported by two singles: "3500" featuring Future and 2 Chainz, and "Antidote". The latter became his highest-charting single on the US Billboard Hot 100 chart, peaking at number 16. Rodeo received generally positive reviews from critics and debuted at number three on the US Billboard 200 chart. It also debuted at number one on the Billboard Rap Albums chart.

On January 4, 2016, Scott would announce that he has a new studio album on the way. On February 8, 2016, it was announced that iLoveMakonnen, Vic Mensa and Scott would be a part of the "WANGSQUAD", an Alexander Wang campaign. On March 29, 2016, 300 Entertainment executive Lyor Cohen, revealed that Scott and Young Thug were releasing a single together and called Scott's upcoming album a "classic". On April 7, 2016, Scott previewed a single with Young Thug at one of his shows. On May 17, 2016, Scott announced that the title of his second album would be Birds in the Trap Sing McKnight, while also confirming the title for his third album to be Astroworld. On June 3, 2016, the collaborative single between Thug and Scott was released, titled "Pick Up the Phone". The single, which also features vocals from Quavo of Atlanta-based rap trio Migos, reached number 43 on the Billboard Hot 100 and was certified double platinum by the Recording Industry Association of America (RIAA).

On August 31, 2016, Scott announced that Birds in the Trap Sing McKnight was finally finished in a post on Instagram. Scott premiered the album on his third episode of .wav radio on September 2, 2016, and was later released on iTunes and Apple Music. On September 11, 2016, the album became Scott's first number one album on the US Billboard 200. On September 12, 2016, Universal Music Publishing Group's CEO, Jody Gerson announced that the label signed a worldwide deal with Scott.

In the same episode Scott premiered Birds in the Trap Sing McKnight, he also announced that he would be executive producing on Kanye West's Cruel Winter, a follow up to his G.O.O.D. Music label's debut compilation Cruel Summer. In the episode he described the upcoming album as, "very youthful, straight to the point, like the illest ever, man, like the illest album".

2017–2018: Cactus Jack Records, Huncho Jack, Jack Huncho, and Astroworld

Scott performed at All-Star Weekend on February 16, 2017, in New Orleans, Louisiana at Champion Square. He also performed at New Orleans BUKU Music + Art Project festival on March 10, 2017. On March 5, Scott announced a concert tour called "Birds Eye View". The next day, the dates and cities for the tour were unveiled, with it beginning on March 10, in New Orleans, Louisiana, and coming to an end on June 2, in Eugene, Oregon. In the same month, Scott was also featured alongside American rapper Quavo from the hip-hop group Migos on Canadian rapper Drake's single "Portland", from Drake's commercial mixtape, More Life. The song peaked at number nine on the US Billboard Hot 100, becoming his first top ten song as a featured artist. In March 2017, Scott announced he would be launching his own imprint, under the name of Cactus Jack Records. During an interview, Scott said, "I'm not doing it to have financial control over my music. I want first and foremost to help other artists, launch new names, to provide opportunities. I want to do for them what happened to me, but better. By better I mean no bullshit. No lying to the artists about album release dates or the budgets of videos and albums." On June 15, 2017, Scott announced he would be doing a European leg of the "Birds Eye View Tour". The European leg started on the June 23 in Paris, and concluded on July 9 in Turku, Finland. This leg was mainly festival sets or in smaller club settings.

On April 3, 2017, it was reported Scott had been working on a collaborative studio album with Quavo, potentially to be released later in 2017. Speaking to GQ, he confirmed: 'The Quavo album is coming soon. I'm dropping new music soon. You know how I do it though: I like surprises. In addition to the collaborative album, Scott announced his third studio album Astroworld, named after the defunct Houston theme park of the same name, was nearing completion and would most likely be released in 2017.

On May 16, 2017, Scott released three new tracks on SoundCloud, after teasing on social media for some time. The tracks were named "A Man", "Green & Purple (featuring Playboi Carti)", and "Butterfly Effect". The latter was also released on every other streaming service, as the only track. The music video for "Butterfly Effect" was released on July 14, 2017. On August 10, 2017, Scott tweeted "ALBUM MODE" as he had just finished the "DAMN. Tour" as a supporting act for Kendrick Lamar, the night before. This tweet signified that he was now working on his album AstroWorld full-time. On August 27, 2017, Scott performed with Thirty Seconds to Mars at the 2017 MTV Video Music Awards on their single "Walk On Water".

On September 18, 2017, Quavo and Migos did an interview, in which Quavo stated that his album with Scott was coming "real soon". He also stated that he and Scott had over 20 records ready. In October 2017, Scott was featured in a special piece titled "Deserve", by Chinese born Canadian rapper Kris Wu. On December 7, 2017, a clip of Quavo being interviewed by Zane Lowe was posted on the official Twitter account for Beats 1. When asked about the title of their upcoming project, he confirmed it would be Huncho Jack, Jack Huncho.

On December 6, 2017, Scott was featured on fellow American rapper and singer Trippie Redd's single "Dark Knight Dummo", the lead single from the latter's debut studio album, Life's a Trip. The song peaked at 72 on the Billboard Hot 100. On December 21, 2017, Scott and Quavo released their collaborative studio album, Huncho Jack, Jack Huncho, under the name "Huncho Jack", a name which comes from Quavo's nickname "Huncho" and a play on Scott's first name "Jack". The album debuted at number 3 on the Billboard 200 and had seven tracks chart on the Billboard Hot 100. After the release of Huncho Jack, Jack Huncho, Webster was spotted in the studio a lot more frequently and Billboard slated an expected first quarter release for AstroWorld.

On May 4, 2018, four days after his 27th birthday, Scott released a single titled "Watch" featuring American rappers Lil Uzi Vert and Kanye West. The single was released as promotional material for his third studio album Astroworld. Astroworld was released on August 3, 2018, to critical acclaim, and debuted at number one on the Billboard 200. "Sicko Mode", the album's second single, peaked at number one on the Billboard Hot 100, becoming Scott's highest charting solo single. On the same month of the album's launch, Scott announced that he was going to launch Astroworld Festival, a music festival with the same name as the album. The festival took place on November 17. On November 2, 2018, Scott was featured on five tracks of Metro Boomin's debut studio album, Not All Heroes Wear Capes: "Overdue", "Dreamcatcher" (alongside Swae Lee), "Up to Something" (alongside Young Thug), "Only 1 (Interlude)", and "No More" (alongside Kodak Black and 21 Savage). In December, Billboard reported that Scott was to make a guest appearance at the Super Bowl LIII halftime show during Maroon 5's set. This performance was met with major backlash.

2019–2020: Look Mom I Can Fly, JackBoys, and The Scotts

On April 18, 2019, Scott released a single with SZA and The Weeknd for the popular HBO series Game of Thrones. It is titled "Power is Power" and is a reference to a scene that took place in the first episode of the show's second season The track is the second song on the Game of Thrones soundtrack album entitled For the Throne. On May 23, 2019, Scott was featured alongside J. Cole on Young Thug's single, "The London", which later appeared as the lead single on Thug's debut studio album, So Much Fun. On August 28, 2019, Scott's documentary film, Look Mom I Can Fly, was released on Netflix. On October 4, 2019, Scott released a single, "Highest in the Room", which debuted and peaked at number one on the Hot 100, being his first song to debut at the top and his second number one following "Sicko Mode" in 2018. The same month, Scott was also featured on the remix of Young Thug's single, "Hot" with Gunna, who was featured on the original song as well. The song was later added to the deluxe edition of So Much Fun in December of that year. Scott also was featured on the track "Hop Off a Jet" from the deluxe edition.

On December 2, 2019, Scott announced a compilation album with his Cactus Jack label members, consisting of Don Toliver, Sheck Wes and producer Chase B, titled JackBoys. On December 24, Scott revealed the album's release date via Instagram. The album was released on December 27, 2019, and featured a remix of "Highest in the Room" featuring Spanish singer Rosalía and American rapper Lil Baby, the latter's verse being leaked months prior. On the same day, Scott released the music video for "Gang Gang" performed by Wes, with uncredited vocals and cameo appearances from Scott, Toliver, and rapper Luxury Tax 50. On December 30, 2019, Scott released the music video for "Gatti", performed with the now-late Pop Smoke. The lyrics of "Gatti" references Scott's breakup with his ex-girlfriend Kylie Jenner. On March 20, 2020, Scott released the music video for "Out West", performed featuring Young Thug.

Scott performed five virtual live shows in the video game Fortnite Battle Royale from April 23 to 25, 2020 with visuals based on his Astroworld tour. It received more than 27 million viewers and boosted the sales of Fortnite-branded Cactus Jack products such as action figures. The performance also included the premiere of his new song with Kid Cudi, who released the song, "The Scotts", as a duo under the same name. Tying with the performance, numerous cosmetic items for player avatars based on Scott and the concert were available to purchase by players of Fortnite Battle Royale. The song debuted at number-one on the Billboard Hot 100, becoming Scott's third US number-one. In May he collaborated for a second time with Rosalía on her track "TKN", where he raps in Spanish for the first time. Scott was on the cover of GQs September 2020 issue, and revealed he will be releasing a collaborative album with Kid Cudi. This follows their number-one single, "The Scotts", released earlier in May.

On the second anniversary of his third studio album Astroworld, Scott teased he was working on a new project. On August 22, 2020, Scott released the single "The Plan", the theme song to Christopher Nolan's film Tenet. He released the single "Franchise" featuring rappers Young Thug and M.I.A. on September 25, 2020. The song was previously previewed on Scott and Chase B's WAV radio, titled "White Tee". It debuted at number one on the U.S. Billboard Hot 100, and Scott became the first artist in Billboard chart history to have three songs debut at number one in less than a year. A remix with an additional feature from American rapper Future, was released on October 7, 2020.

2021–present: Return to performing and Utopia

From mid to late-2020, Scott began teasing his fourth studio album Utopia. On January 15, 2021, Scott released a remix of "Goosebumps" with producer HVME. After canceling the third annual Astroworld Fest due to the COVID-19 pandemic, Scott announced the return of the festival in 2021 and expanded it to a multi day format. On April 30, Scott was featured on "Durag Activity" by Baby Keem. In June, Scott announced a collaboration between Dior and Cactus Jack for the 2022 Summer Men's collection. On August 28, Scott was featured on Kanye West's tenth studio album Donda on the song "Praise God" also with Baby Keem, whom Scott had previously collaborated with. On September 3, Scott appeared on Drake's Certified Lover Boy, on the song "Fair Trade", which peaked in the top 10 of the Hot 100 at number three. On October 8, Don Toliver released an album Life of a Don, which featured Scott on songs titled "Flocky Flocky" and "You".

On October 30, 2021, Scott closed out day 3 of Rolling Loud NYC. During the set he performed the unreleased song "Escape Plan" and a preview of another unreleased track off Utopia. In November 2021, he announced new music to be released on November 5, 2021; he was believed to release a project reportedly titled Dystopia, but instead he released a two-song single "ESCAPE PLAN / MAFIA".

On April 22, 2022, Scott was featured on his first song since the  Astroworld Festival crowd crush, "Hold That Heat" alongside Future and producer Southside. On April 27, 2022, the Primavera Sound festival announced that Scott is scheduled to perform at their festivals held in Buenos Aires, Santiago, and São Paulo respectively. On May 15, 2022, he performed at the 2022 Billboard Music Awards. This performance was his first since the Astroworld Festival tragedy in 2021. On August 6, 2022, Scott performed his first solo show since the Astroworld Festival tragedy at The O2 Arena in London. That month, it was also announced that Scott would begin a Las Vegas nightclub residency titled "Road to Utopia" in September.

On November 29, 2022, the music video for Future's song "712PM" from I Never Liked You was released, in which Scott served as the director.

On December 2, 2022, Scott collaborated with Metro Boomin on four tracks of his second studio album Heroes & Villains: "Raindrops (Insane)", "Trance" (alongside Young Thug), "Niagara Falls (Foot or 2)" (alongside 21 Savage), and "Lock on Me" (alongside Future), as well as background vocals on "Creepin'" (with The Weeknd and 21 Savage).

Other ventures

Cactus Jack Records

Cactus Jack Records is an American record label founded by Scott in 2017. It is distributed by Epic Records. The label also has its own publishing division Cactus Jack Publishing.

During an interview regarding the label, Scott said;

Astroworld Festival

Following the release of Astroworld, Scott announced the Astroworld Festival, an annual festive concert that would take place across the street from the former site of Six Flags AstroWorld. The 2018 Astroworld Festival contained appearances from Post Malone, Lil Wayne, Young Thug, Rae Sremmurd, Gunna, Houston All Stars, Sheck Wes, Metro Boomin, Trippie Redd, Smokepurpp, Virgil Abloh, and Tommy Genesis.

The 2019 festival contained appearances from Gucci Mane, Migos, Rosalía, Tay Keith, Pop Smoke, Young Thug, Young Dolph, Key Glock, Pharrell Williams, Sheck Wes, Marilyn Manson, DaBaby, Megan Thee Stallion, Don Toliver, Playboi Carti, and Houston All Stars.

The 2020 festival was cancelled due to the ongoing COVID-19 pandemic.

On November 5, the first night of the 2021 Astroworld Festival, a fatal crowd crush occurred. Ten people died from compressive asphyxiation, twenty-five people were hospitalised, and more than 300 people were treated for injuries.

Fashion
On April 30, 2019, Scott announced a collaboration with Nike to release his Cactus Jack Air Jordan 1's in May that year.

On June 24, 2021, Scott announced a collaboration with Dior for a menswear collection that is scheduled to be released in the summer of 2021. A live stream showcasing the collection was released on June 25. The live stream also showcased snippets of songs from his upcoming fourth studio album Utopia featuring a song with Westside Gunn and instrumentals from the album.

McDonald's

In September 2020, Scott collaborated with McDonald's to launch a limited edition meal that was introduced in participating McDonald's restaurants in North America, named "The Travis Scott" and a variation on their Quarter Pounder with Cheese. The partnership marked the first nationally distributed celebrity-endorsed McDonald's meal in the chain’s history, and the first celebrity meal since 1992, when McDonald's launched a “McJordan” burger with Michael Jordan in the Chicago metropolitan area. Due to high demand, some McDonald's branches ran out of ingredients tied to the promotion, causing a break in the supply chain. Scott and McDonald's also launched a line of McDonald's and Cactus Jack–branded merchandise, including a number of clothing items, a rug, and a McNugget-shaped body pillow. This popularized the celebrity meal craze, which would later be done similarly by BTS and Saweetie. The idea was exported to Europe in the fall of 2021, with Spanish singer Aitana serving as the first European act to have its own McDonald's meal.

PlayStation
In October 2020, Scott announced he was joining the PlayStation team as a Strategic Creative Partner to promote the PlayStation 5 console. Together, they released special merchandise, which includes a previously unseen version of Nike Dunk Lows. They also uploaded a special unboxing video of the PlayStation 5 console to YouTube. The video features footage of Scott playing the console alongside fans, a piano performance by James Blake, and a tribute to Pop Smoke.

The Scotts
Aside from his solo musical career, Scott is also one-half of the alternative hip hop super-duo the Scotts, alongside his mentor and frequent collaborator, American musician Kid Cudi. They have currently been working on their debut collaborative effort since 2020, when the duo released the Billboard Hot 100 number one single, "The Scotts". In December 2022, Cudi revealed they were no longer working on the album, effectively announcing its cancellation.

Film industry
Scott made his theatrical debut in the 2021 film Gully as a movie store owner. He also contributed to the film's soundtrack but his song "Knife" was cut due to sampling issues, but was still featured briefly in the film. On August 2, 2021, Scott signed a movie production deal with A24. The same day he announced the completion of a draft for a film based on his upcoming fourth studio album Utopia.

Cactus Jack Foundation
Scott established the Cactus Jack Foundation in November 2020, to assist Houston youth with education expenses and creative endeavors. In December 2021, the foundation gave out thousands of toys to the children of Houston. On May 17, 2022, Scott announced that he would give away $1 million in scholarships to 100 HBCU college students from the graduating class of 2022 through the Cactus Jack Foundation.

Artistry

Scott has stated that Björk is "one of my biggest inspirations for why I do what I do". He is also influenced by Bon Iver, Kid Cudi, M.I.A., Kanye West, Toro y Moi, Tame Impala, T.I., and Thom Yorke. Spin magazine compared his 2013 mixtape Owl Pharaoh to Kid Cudi's Man on the Moon II: The Legend of Mr. Rager.

Scott makes heavy use of audio manipulation effects such as Auto-Tune, phasing, delays, and stereo-sculpted chorusing and harmony structures, predominantly influenced by producers Mike Dean and Alex Tumay. Scott's musical style has been characterized as "ambient"; Scott himself has said "I'm not hip-hop". Vulture described Scott's sound as "unremittingly dark, syncretic, hi-res, and above all unnatural". Scott’s musical style has been described as being hip hop, Southern hip hop, trap, psychedelic, and pop rap.

Scott has said that he is a fan of Broadway theatre and would like to do an album of show tune covers. He has said that he would like to write his own musical in the future.

Personal life
Scott began dating media personality and businesswoman Kylie Jenner in April 2017. In February 2018, Jenner gave birth to their daughter. Jenner appeared in the music video for "Stop Trying to Be God", from Scott's third studio album Astroworld. They broke up in September 2019, but quarantined together during the COVID-19 pandemic for the sake of their daughter and ended up rekindling their relationship. On September 7, 2021, after weeks of speculation, Jenner revealed that she and Scott were expecting their second child. Jenner gave birth to their son in February 2022.

Controversies and legal issues

Incidents at performances
Scott's performances have experienced a number of issues. At Lollapalooza in 2015, Scott was charged and arrested for disorderly conduct after inciting concertgoers to ignore security and rush the stage. That same year, at the Openair Festival in Switzerland, he encouraged fans to attack a man who took his shoe while he was crowd-surfing, by stopping the concert and repeatedly telling the crowd to "fuck him up", while also spitting on him.

In 2017, he was arrested for similar conduct to his Lollapalooza behavior after a performance in Northwest Arkansas. That same year, a fan sued Scott and the organizers of a 2017 concert at Terminal 5 in Manhattan after falling from a balcony and being dragged on stage, blaming the fall on a crowd surge. In 2019, three people were trampled and injured as a crowd rushed to enter the compound at Astroworld.

Astroworld Festival crowd crush

On November 5, 2021, at least ten people died and hundreds were injured in a crowd crush moving toward the stage during Scott's performance at the Astroworld Festival in NRG Park in his hometown of Houston, Texas. On the first night, a crowd crush occurred, resulting in the deaths of at least nine people and the cancellation of the second night of the festival.  In video footage of the incident, Scott is seen doing the following: continuing to perform despite chants from the crowd pleading for him to stop; observing at least one audience member had been hurt, then ordering security for a brief moment to "help, jump in real quick, keep going", only to continue with the rest of the show for the following hour; encouraging people to "get wild" and "crazy", despite an ambulance passing through the crowd that was pulling out lifeless bodies. Victims killed ranged from 9 to 27 years old.

In the aftermath of the crush, news outlets highlighted Scott's history of dangerous disregard for audience safety. Rolling Stone featured a statement from a fan who had been paralyzed during a 2017 show; The New York Times took note of Scott's 2015 guilty plea for reckless endangerment after he encouraged fans to climb security barricades; a Los Angeles Times article contained analysis by safety experts arguing that the deaths were preventable. Among other points of criticism was the fact that Scott halted his performance in 2015, when an audience member stole his shoe, ordering the crowd to beat up the person responsible. Shortly after, a lawsuit was announced by the concertgoers. It was started by Kristian Paredes, who filed for $1,000,000 due to the injuries he received.

Nebula assault allegations 
On March 1, 2023, Scott was performing at Nebula, a nightclub in New York City, alongside Don Toliver when a sound technician, identified only as Mark, asked Scott to lower the music as it was too loud for the venue's size. Scott reportedly responded by giving Mark the finger and punched him in the head, resulting in Mark needing medical attention and police being called to the scene around 3:25 a.m. Scott had reportedly been drinking alcohol and damaged $12,000 in the club's sound equipment before he left the premises. The New York City Police Department issued a warrant for Scott's arrest in relation to the incident on March 2, 2023.

Discography

Studio albums
 Rodeo (2015)
 Birds in the Trap Sing McKnight (2016)
 Astroworld (2018)
 Utopia (2023)

Filmography

Awards and nominations

Grammy Awards
The Grammy Awards are awarded annually by the National Academy of Recording Arts and Sciences. Scott has nine nominations.

|-
||2014
|"New Slaves" (as songwriter)
|Best Rap Song
|
|-
||2017
|"Purpose" (as featured artist)
|Album of the Year
|
|-
|2018
|"Love Galore"  (with SZA)
|Best Rap/Sung Performance
|
|-
|rowspan="3"|2019
|rowspan="2"|"Sicko Mode" (with Drake and Swae Lee)
|Best Rap Performance
|
|-
|Best Rap Song
|
|-
|Astroworld
|Best Rap Album
|
|-
||2020
|"The London" (with Young Thug and J. Cole)
|Best Rap/Sung Performance
|
|-
||2021
|"Highest in the Room"
|Best Melodic Rap Performance
|
|-
|rowspan="2"|2022
|Donda (as featured artist)
|Album of the Year
|
|-

Latin Grammy Awards
The Latin Grammy Awards are awarded annually by the National Academy of Recording Arts and Sciences. Scott won one award from one nomination.

|-
|2020
|Best Short Form Music Video
||"TKN" (Rosalía featuring Travis Scott)
|

Concert tours
Headlining
Rodeo Tour (with Young Thug and Metro Boomin) (2015)
Birds Eye View Tour (North America and Europe) (2017)
Astroworld: Wish You Were Here Tour (with Trippie Redd, Sheck Wes and Gunna) (2018–2019)
 Astroworld Festival (also known as Astrofest) (2018-2019, 2021)
 Fortnite x Cactus Jack presents ASTRONOMICAL (2020)
 Rolling Loud (2023)
Supporting
Never Sober Tour (with Juicy J and Project Pat) (2015)
The Madness Fall Tour (with The Weeknd and Banks) (2015)
Anti World Tour (with Rihanna) (2016)
The Damn. Tour (with Kendrick Lamar and DRAM) (2017)

References

External links

 
 
 
 
 Travis Scott on Spotify
 

1991 births
Living people
21st-century African-American male singers
21st-century American rappers
African-American male rappers
African-American male singer-songwriters
African-American record producers
Age controversies
American hip hop record producers
American hip hop singers
Astroworld Festival crowd crush
Epic Records artists
GOOD Music artists
Grand Hustle Records artists
Kardashian family
Alternative hip hop musicians
Latin Grammy Award winners
People from Missouri City, Texas
Pop rappers
Psychedelic musicians
Rappers from Houston
Record producers from Texas
Singer-songwriters from Texas
Southern hip hop musicians
Spokespersons
Trap musicians
University of Texas at San Antonio alumni